Martin Goldsmith may refer to:
 Martin Goldsmith (screenwriter), American screenwriter and novelist
 Martin Goldsmith (radio host), American radio personality and author
 Martin Goldsmith (footballer), Welsh footballer